Streptomyces olivaceus is a bacterium species from the genus of Streptomyces which has been isolated from soil. Streptomyces olivaceus produces granaticin, elloramycin, tetroazolemycin A and tetroazolemycin B. Streptomyces olivaceus can be used to produce vitamin B12.

Further reading 
 
 
 
 
 
 
 <

See also 
 List of Streptomyces species

References

External links
Type strain of Streptomyces olivaceus at BacDive -  the Bacterial Diversity Metadatabase

olivaceus
Bacteria described in 1948